Dinorah Enríquez (19 January 1947 – 14 March 1998) was a Puerto Rican fencer. She competed in the women's individual foil event at the 1976 Summer Olympics. She also won a bronze medal at the 1982 Central American and Caribbean Games in the team foil event.

References

External links
 

1947 births
1998 deaths
Puerto Rican female fencers
Olympic fencers of Puerto Rico
Fencers at the 1976 Summer Olympics
People from Fajardo, Puerto Rico
20th-century American women